Anja Frešer (born 4 September 1974 in Maribor, Slovenia) is a former Slovenian handball player.

References

1974 births
Expatriate handball players
Sportspeople from Maribor
Slovenian expatriate sportspeople in France
Living people
Slovenian expatriate sportspeople in Denmark
Slovenian expatriate sportspeople in Spain
Slovenian expatriate sportspeople in Greece
Slovenian expatriate sportspeople in Turkey